Pol Salvador Hernández (born 2 April 2001) is a Spanish footballer who plays for UD Las Palmas as an attacking midfielder.

Club career
Born in Camprodon, Girona, Catalonia, Salvador joined UD Las Palmas' youth setup in 2018, from CE Mataró. On 26 February 2019, he renewed his contract with the Canarians.

Salvador made his senior debut with the C-team on 19 April 2019, starting in a 0–0 away draw against CD El Cotillo. On 20 July of the following year, before even having appeared for the reserves, he made his first team debut by coming on as a late substitute for Josemi Castañeda in a 5–1 home routing of Extremadura UD in the Segunda División; he had to leave the field shortly after coming in due to a head trauma after a shock with fellow debutant Álex Domínguez.

References

External links

2001 births
Living people
People from Ripollès
Sportspeople from the Province of Girona
Spanish footballers
Footballers from Catalonia
Association football midfielders
Segunda División players
Segunda División B players
Segunda Federación players
Tercera División players
UD Las Palmas C players
UD Las Palmas Atlético players
UD Las Palmas players